Shane Burgos (born March 19, 1991) is an American professional mixed martial artist. He currently competes in the Featherweight division in the Professional Fighters League (PFL). Burgos previously competed for Cage Fury Fighting Championships and the Ultimate Fighting Championship.

Mixed martial arts career

Ultimate Fighting Championship
Burgos made his promotional debut on December 9, 2016 at UFC Fight Night 102 against Tiago Trator. He won the fight by unanimous decision.

Burgos' next fight came at UFC 210 against Charles Rosa. He won the fight via TKO in the third round. Both participants were awarded Fight of the Night for their performance.

He then faced Godofredo Pepey on July 22, 2017 at UFC on Fox 25. He won the fight by unanimous decision with scores of 30–26 (twice) and 29–28.

On January 20, 2018 at UFC 220, Burgos fought Calvin Kattar. He lost the fight via TKO in the third round. Subsequently, both participants were awarded the Fight of the Night bonus. This resulted in Burgos first loss.

Next, Burgos faced Kurt Holobaugh on November 3, 2018 at UFC 230. He won the fight via submission in round one.

Burgos next faced Cub Swanson on May 4, 2019 at UFC Fight Night 151. He won the fight via split decision.

Burgos' next and final fight of his prevailing contract was with Makwan Amirkhani on November 2, 2019 at UFC 244. He won the fight via TKO in the third round.

On March 29, 2020, news surfaced that after entertaining offers from various organizations, Burgos signed a new four-fight contract with the UFC.

Burgos faced Josh Emmett on June 20, 2020 at UFC on ESPN: Blaydes vs. Volkov. He lost the back-and-forth bout via unanimous decision. Subsequently, Burgos earned his third  Fight of the Night  bonus award.

Burgos was expected to face Hakeem Dawodu on January 24, 2021 at UFC 257. However, Dawodu was forced to withdraw from the bout, citing a shoulder injury. In turn, Burgos was removed from the card as well.

Burgos faced Edson Barboza on May 15, 2021 at UFC 262. Burgos lost the back-and-forth fight via knockout in the third round, experiencing a delayed reaction to being knocked out with a right cross. This fight earned Burgos the $75,000 Fight of the Night bonus award.

Burgos faced Billy Quarantillo on November 6, 2021 at UFC 268. Burgos won the fight via unanimous decision.

Burgos faced Charles Jourdain July 16, 2022, at UFC on ABC 3. He won the back-and-forth fight via majority decision.

Professional Fighters League
Following his fight with Jourdain, the last on his UFC contract, Burgos indicated he would test free agency. On August 15, 2022, Burgos announced he had signed with the Professional Fighters League (PFL).

Burgos was scheduled to face Marlon Moraes in his PFL debut on November 25, 2022 at PFL 10. However, Burgos withdrew from the bout due to an injury.

Moving up to Lightweight, Burgos will start off the 2023 season against Olivier Aubin-Mercier on April 14, 2023 at PFL 3.

Championships and awards
 Ultimate Fighting Championship
 Fight of the Night (Four times)

Mixed martial arts record

|-
|Win
|align=center|15–3
|Charles Jourdain
|Decision (majority)
|UFC on ABC: Ortega vs. Rodríguez
|
|align=center|3
|align=center|5:00
|Elmont, New York, United States
|
|-
|Win
|align=center|14–3
|Billy Quarantillo
|Decision (unanimous)
|UFC 268
|
|align=center|3
|align=center|5:00
|New York City, New York, United States
|
|-
|Loss
|align=center|13–3
|Edson Barboza
|KO (punches) 
|UFC 262
|
|align=center|3
|align=center|1:16
|Houston, Texas, United States
|
|-
|Loss
|align=center|13–2
|Josh Emmett
|Decision (unanimous)
|UFC on ESPN: Blaydes vs. Volkov 
|
|align=center|3
|align=center|5:00
|Las Vegas, Nevada, United States
|
|-
|Win
|align=center|13–1
|Makwan Amirkhani
|TKO (punches)
|UFC 244 
|
|align=center|3
|align=center|4:32
|New York City, New York, United States
|
|-
|Win
|align=center|12–1
|Cub Swanson
|Decision (split)
|UFC Fight Night: Iaquinta vs. Cowboy 
|
|align=center|3
|align=center|5:00
|Ottawa, Ontario, Canada
|  
|-
|Win
|align=center| 11–1
|Kurt Holobaugh
|Submission (armbar)
|UFC 230 
|
|align=center|1
|align=center|2:11
|New York City, New York, United States
|
|-
|Loss
|align=center| 10–1
|Calvin Kattar
|TKO (punches)
|UFC 220 
|
|align=center|3
|align=center|0:32
|Boston, Massachusetts, United States
|
|-
|Win
|align=center| 10–0
|Godofredo Pepey
|Decision (unanimous)
|UFC on Fox: Weidman vs. Gastelum 
|
|align=center|3
|align=center|5:00
|Uniondale, New York, United States
|
|-
|Win
|align=center| 9–0
|Charles Rosa
|TKO (punches)
|UFC 210
|
|align=center|3
|align=center|1:59
|Buffalo, New York, United States
|
|-
|Win
|align=center| 8–0
|Tiago Trator
|Decision (unanimous)
|UFC Fight Night: Lewis vs. Abdurakhimov
|
|align=center|3
|align=center|5:00
|Albany, New York, United States
|
|-
|Win
|align=center|7–0
|Jacob Bohn
|KO (punch)
|CFFC 56
|
|align=center|1
|align=center|4:52
|Philadelphia, Pennsylvania, United States
|
|-
|Win
|align=center|6–0
|Terrell Hobbs
|TKO (punches)
|CFFC 45
|
|align=center|1
|align=center|4:03
|Atlantic City, New Jersey, United States
|
|-
|Win
|align=center|5–0
|Bill Algeo
|Submission (rear-naked choke)
|CFFC 42
|
|align=center|2
|align=center|2:35
|Chester, Pennsylvania, United States
|
|-
|Win
|align=center|4–0
|Donald Ooton
|Submission (guillotine choke)
|CFFC 35
|
|align=center|1
|align=center|3:10
|Atlantic City, New Jersey, United States
|
|-
|Win
|align=center|3–0
|Myron Baker
|Submission (rear-naked choke)
|CFFC 31
|
|align=center|2
|align=center|2:12
|Atlantic City, New Jersey, United States
|
|-
|Win
|align=center|2–0
|Ashure Elbanna
|TKO (punches)
|Ring of Combat 46
|
|align=center|1
|align=center|2:16
|Atlantic City, New Jersey, United States
|
|-
|Win
|align=center|1–0
|Ratioender Melo
|Submission (rear-naked choke)
|Xtreme Caged Combat: Vendetta
|
|align=center|1
|align=center|2:14
|Philadelphia, Pennsylvania, United States
|

See also
 List of current PFL fighters

References

External links
 
 

American male mixed martial artists
Featherweight mixed martial artists
Mixed martial artists from New York (state)
People from Woodbury, Nassau County, New York
1991 births
Living people
Ultimate Fighting Championship male fighters